Süleymanpaşazade Mehmed Sami, also known as Süleyman Nesib (1866–1917) was an Ottoman writer and educator during the Second Constitutional Era. He wrote for the Servet-i Fünun, a weekly newspaper in the Ottoman Empire.

References 

1866 births
1917 deaths
Writers from Istanbul
Turkish poets
Turkish educators